The Battle of Aslanduz took place from 31 October to 1 November 1812 between Russian Empire and Qajar Iran during the Russo-Persian War (1804-1813). The Persian commander Fath Ali Shah stationed his forces, led by his two heirs, Abbas Mirza and Dowlatshah, in Aslanduz. Russian forces under the command of Major General Pyotr Kotlyarevsky launched a surprise night attack and routed the Persians, who were still sleeping. Kotlyarevsky then quickly moved on to storm Lankaran successfully in early 1813 which ended any Persian hope of continuing the war or settling on a stalemate for both parties.

The Persian suffered heavy casualties numbering around 2,000 killed and 500 captured. The Russians lost 28 men with 99 wounded. Among those killed during the battle was Charles Christie, a British officer in the service of Iran.

See also
 Battle of Sultanabad
 Siege of Lankaran

References

Sources
 

Battles involving Russia
Battles involving Qajar Iran
Conflicts in 1812
History of Ardabil Province
19th century in Azerbaijan
1812 in the Russian Empire
1812 in Iran
Battles of the Russo-Persian Wars
October 1812 events